The Costa Book Awards were a set of annual literary awards recognising English-language books by writers based in UK and Ireland. Originally named the Whitbread Book Awards from 1971 to 2005 after its first sponsor, the Whitbread company, then a brewery and owner of restaurant chains, it was renamed when Costa Coffee, then a subsidiary of Whitbread, took over sponsorship. The companion Costa Short Story Award was established in 2012. Costa Coffee was purchased by the Coca-Cola Company in 2018. The awards were abruptly terminated in 2022. 

The awards were given both for high literary merit and for works that were enjoyable reading, and their aim was to convey the enjoyment of reading to the widest possible audience. As such, they were considered a more populist literary prize than the Booker Prize, which also limited winners to literature written in the UK and Ireland.

Awards were separated into six categories: Biography, Children's Books, First Novel, Novel, Poetry, and Short Story.

In 1989, there was controversy when the judges first awarded the Best Novel prize to Alexander Stuart's The War Zone, then withdrew the prize prior to the ceremony amid acrimony among the judges, ultimately awarding it to Lindsay Clarke's The Chymical Wedding.

History
The 1989 Whitbread Book Award for Best Novel was first awarded to The War Zone by Alexander Stuart. However, juror Jane Gardam felt the book was "repellent" and appealed directly to the Whitbread company, arguing that awarding the prize to Stuart's novel would make them into a "laughing stock". After ten days, and leaking the story to the press, the other two jurors, David Cook and Val Hennessy, were persuaded to change their minds, and Lindsay Clarke's The Chymical Wedding won the award instead. Both Cook and Hennessy found the experience so unpleasant they vowed to never sit in an award jury again.

The awards were discontinued in 2022, with the 2021 awards being the last ones made. Just one month later, the Blue Peter Book Award was also discontinued; this left only two widely recognized awards for UK children's literature (the Waterstones Children's Book Prize and the Kate Greenaway Medal).

Process
There were five book award categories. These had not been changed since the Poetry Award was introduced in 1985, although the children's category had been termed "children's novel" or "children's book of the year". The categories are:

 Novel
 First novel
 Children's book
 Poetry
 Biography

Each of the five winning writers received £5,000. The prize required a £5,000 fee from publishers if a book was to be shortlisted.

Short stories
The short story award was established in 2012 with a prize of £3,500 for the first, £1,000 for the second and £500 for the third. The winning story was determined by public vote from a shortlist of six that were selected by a panel of judges. The process was "blind" at both stages for the unpublished entries were anonymous until the conclusion.

In the inaugural year, the six short story finalists were exposed anonymously online while the public vote was underway, two months before the winner was to be announced.

Winners

Bold font and blue ribbon distinguish the overall Costa/Whitbread Book of the Year.

For lists that include shortlisted entries (where available), please see:
 Costa Book Award for Novel
 Costa Book Award for First Novel
 Costa Book Award for Children's Book
 Costa Book Award for Poetry
 Costa Book Award for Biography
 Costa Book Award for Short Story

List of award winners

See also
 List of British literary awards
 List of Irish literary awards
 List of literary awards
 English literature
 Irish literature
 European literature
 British literature
 Literature
 List of years in literature

References

External links

Injecting Caffeine Into the Whitbread (Now Costa) Book Awards at The Book Standard

  
1971 establishments in the United Kingdom
Awards established in 1971
Awards disestablished in 2022
English-language literary awards